The Centre national de coopération au développement (CNCD-11.11.11) is a Belgian non-governmental organization for international solidarity that has been active since 1966.

This French-language association includes eighty associations and NGOs, as well as social organizations whose goal is a world where legitimate and adequately financed states cooperate to ensure peace and the fundamental rights of all.

Composition and actions 
The CNCD-11.11.11 was founded on a fundamental value of cooperation in development: solidarity. The CNCD-11.11.11 unites more than eighty development organizations and thousands of volunteers and sympathizers.

Since 1966, the CNCD-11.11.11 has pursued three missions :  questioning public and private power, public education on the international staked and the financing of development programs such as Operation 11.11.11.

Questioning 
As coordination, the CNCD-11.11.11 questions national and international actors about their responsibilities for cooperation in development and international solidarity. Through these political actions, CNCD-11.11.11 targets both a stronger realization of the real causes of misdevelopment and the promotion of measures that favor the relations between peoples based on justice and the respect of fundamental individual and collective rights.

Educating 
Development education targets a change of values and attitudes on both the individual and collective levels with a goal of social change. The CNCD-11.11.11 carries out education  and information campaigns and population mobilization, with the help of member organizations. These campaigns center on such themes as north-south relations, access to economic and social rights, food sovereignty, citizen engagement in elections, the abolition of third-world debt and climate justice. They rely on information and animation tools, public advocacy and organization of events.

Financing 
Thanks to Operation 11.11.11, the CNCD-11.11.11 is able to finance 50 programs each year in Africa, Latin America, The Middle East and Asia. Imagined et carried out by associations of that country, these projects apply often creative formulas to find durable solutions to daily problems faced the population, especially in the areas of health, education and community organization.

Member Associations of CNCD-11.11.11

References

Organisations based in Belgium
Political advocacy groups in Europe
Organizations established in 1966